Love 101 is a Turkish teen comedy-drama, starring Mert Yazıcıoğlu, Kubilay Aka, Alina Boz, Selahattin Paşalı, İpek Filiz Yazıcı, Pınar Deniz, Kaan Urgancıoğlu and Ece Yüksel (2nd season). Its first season, which consists of 8 episodes, is directed by Ahmet Katıksız and Deniz Yorulmazer, written by Meriç Acemi and Destan Sedolli. The series started streaming on Netflix on 24 April 2020.

The second and final season premiered on 30 September 2021. It's directed by Umut Aral and Gönenç Uyanık and consists of 8 episodes.

Plot 
The story begins in today's Istanbul when a woman called Işık (Bade İşçil) arrives at an old house. There she recalls the past and friends of her youth.

Back in 1998, a group of young people (Eda, Osman, Sinan, and Kerem) studying in a school of Istanbul are at risk of expulsion because of their poor behavior. They are very different from their classmates, therefore, very lonely. The headmaster and most of the teachers are against them, only one teacher by the name of Burcu (Pınar Deniz) does her best to protect the teenagers. However, they find out that Burcu will be relocated, which means that all of them would be expelled after her relocation. In order to prevent this, the students unite and make a plan. The students discover that according to the law, she can choose the place of work by herself if she is married. They decide that they will try to make Burcu fall in love with the new sports teacher, Kemal (Kaan Urgancıoğlu), so that she can stay in Istanbul. Soon enough they discover that Burcu is already in a "happy" relationship and that it won't be easy to make her stay. They ask for help from Işık (İpek Filiz Yazıcı), an excellent student and a girl with a big heart. Soon she becomes a part of their group. This union helps the students change for the better, understand themselves, realize the importance of true friendship, find love and their own way in life. Eda (Alina Boz) aspires to be a graphic designer, even though her family wants her to gain money and has already been preparing her for social mobility. Osman (Selahattin Paşalı) is a young entrepreneur, trying to hustle his way out of poverty by always finding gigs. Sinan (Mert Yazıcıoğlu) struggles to keep his life together, always sipping from his hip flask as he continues living with his senile grandfather since he was 14 after his family’s divorce. Kerem (Kubilay Aka), a basketball player who gets kicked out of the school team also endeavors the struggles of being the son of a very famous person in Turkey.

Cast

Main 
 Mert Yazıcıoğlu as Sinan
 Kubilay Aka as Kerem
 Alina Boz as Eda
 Selahattin Paşalı as Osman
 İpek Filiz Yazıcı as Işık
 Pınar Deniz as Burcu
Kaan Urgancıoğlu as Kemal
 Ece Yüksel as Elif (season 2)

Recurring 
 Müfit Kayacan as Necdet
 Fatih Al as Yıldıray (season 2)
 Bade İşçil as adult Işık
 Tuba Ünsal as adult Eda
 Mert Fırat as adult Kerem (season 2)
 Fatih Artman as adult Osman (season 2)
 Uraz Kaygılaroğlu as adult Sinan (season 2)
 Ali Il as Tuncay
 Merve Akkaya as Billur

Episodes

Season 1 (2020)

Season 2 (2021)

Filming 
The principal photography for the first and second seasons took place at Akif Tunçel Vocational and Technical Anatolian High School in Şişli, Istanbul.

Reaction 
Before the series' premiere, it was claimed that the character Osman was being used for "homosexual propaganda" and "deviance". Netflix denied these claims. The critics, who watched the first 8 episodes of the series and wrote about it in their columns, stated that there is no such character in the series.

References

External links
 
 

2020 Turkish television series debuts
2020 Turkish television series endings
2020s Turkish television series
LGBT-related controversies in television
Turkish-language Netflix original programming
Turkish comedy television series
Television shows set in Istanbul
Television series produced in Istanbul